Delahaye is a French surname. It may refer to:
 Angélique Delahaye (born 1963), French trade unionist and politician 
 Charles Delahaye (born 1905), former Canadian ice hockey player
 Émile Delahaye (born 1843), French automotive pioneer
 Ernest Delahaye (born 1853), French writer
 Félix Delahaye (born 1767), French gardener
 Gilbert Delahaye (born 1923), Belgian author
Hippolyte Delehaye (born 1859), Belgian Jesuit hagiographic scholar
 Isaac Delahaye (born 1982), lead guitarist for symphonic metal band Epica
 Jacquotte Delahaye ( 1656), French female pirate in the Caribbean Sea
 Jean-Paul Delahaye (born 1952), French computer scientist and mathematician
 Laurent Delahaye (born 1977), French racing driver
 Luc Delahaye (born 1962), French photographer
 Rob Delahaye (born 1959), Dutch former professional footballer

See also
De la Haye (disambiguation)
De la Hay (disambiguation)
Hay (disambiguation)
Hays (disambiguation)
Hay (surname)
Hayes (surname)
Delahaye, automobile manufacturing company
Clan Hay
Haye

Surnames of French origin
Surnames of English origin
Surnames of Norman origin
Surnames of Scottish origin